The sociétaires of the Comédie-Française are chosen from among the pensionnaires who have been in the company a year or more.

They are decided upon in the course of a general assembly of the company's administrative committee, made up of 6 existing sociétaires, the senior sociétaire, and the general administrator.  A pensionnaire is thus named a societaire by a decree of the Ministry of Culture, from names put forward by the general administrator of the Comédie-Française.  On becoming a sociétaire, an actor automatically becomes a member of the Société des Comédiens-Français and receives a share of the profits as well as receiving a number of shares in the société to which he or she is contractually linked.

After his or her retirement, a sociétaire can continue to act, becoming an honorary sociétaire.  The senior member of the Comédie-Française is not the oldest sociétaire, but the sociétaire who has been with the company longest (since their entering it as a pensionnaire).

Some Sociétaires of the Comédie-Française

17th century

Michel Baron (1680)
Rosimond (1680)
Armande Béjart (1680)
Mademoiselle de Brie (1680)
Champmeslé (1680)
Marie Champmeslé (1680)
Mademoiselle Du Croisy (1680)
Charles Varlet de La Grange (1680)
Mademoiselle La Grange (1680)
Raymond Poisson, known as Belleroche (1680)
Brécourt (1682)
Dancourt (1685)
Jean Quinault (1695)
Charlotte Desmares (1699)

18th century

Quinault-Dufresne (1712)
Adrienne Lecouvreur (1717)
Jeanne Gaussin (1731)
Marie Dumesnil (1738)
Mademoiselle Clairon (1743)
Marie Brillant (1750)
Lekain (1751)
Mademoiselle Hus (1753)
Préville (1753)
Dalainville (1758)
François Molé (1761)
Jacques Marie Boutet (1772)
Dugazon (1772)
Monvel (1772)
Dazincourt (1778)

Amélie-Julie Candeille (1785)
Mademoiselle Lange (1788)
Talma (1789)
Madame Desgarcins (1789)
Mademoiselle Fleury (1791)
Grandmesnil (1792)
Mademoiselle Mars (1799)

19th century

Mademoiselle George (1804)
Mademoiselle Anaïs (1832)
Rachel (1842)
Clémentine Jouassain (1863)
Coquelin aîné (1864)
Jeanne Samary (1874)
Mounet-Sully (1874)
Sarah Bernhardt (1875)
Jules Truffier (1888)
Marguerite Moreno (1890)
Jeanne Ludwig (1893)
Marthe Brandès (1896)
Raphaël Duflos (1896)

20th century

Cécile Sorel (1904)
Berthe Cerny (1909)
Gabrielle Colonna-Romano (1913)
Denis d'Inès (1920)
Mary Marquet (1923)
Pierre Fresnay (1924)
Gabrielle Robinne (1924)
Madeleine Renaud (1928)
Marie Bell (1928)
Fernand Ledoux (1931)
Pierre Dux (1935)
Gisèle Casadesus (1938)
Julien Bertheau (1942)
Louis Seigner (1943)
Jean-Louis Barrault (1943)
Raimu (1944)
Jacques Charon (1947)
Micheline Boudet (1950)
Jean Davy (1950)
Robert Hirsch (1952)
Jean Piat (1953)
Paul Meurisse (1956)
Jean Yonnel (1956)
Denise Gence (1958)
Georges Descrières (1958)
Jacques Sereys (1959)
Jacques Toja
Jean-Paul Roussillon (1960)
François Chaumette (1960)
Bernard Dhéran (1961)
Catherine Samie (1962)
Michel Etcheverry (1964)	
Renée Faure (1965) 
Michel Aumont (1965)
René Camoin (1966)
Michel Duchaussoy (1967)
Françoise Seigner (1968)
Paule Noëlle (1969)
Isabelle Adjani (1972)
Jean-Luc Boutté (1975)
Catherine Hiegel (1976)
Claude Giraud (1976)
Francis Huster (1977)
Patrice Kerbrat (1977)
Jean Le Poulain (1981)	
Martine Chevallier (1988)
Michel Favory (1988)
Catherine Sauval (1989)
Jean-Luc Bideau (1991)	 
Philippe Torreton (1994)
Andrzej Seweryn (1995)
Michel Robin (1996)
Éric Ruf (1998)
Éric Génovèse (1998)
Bruno Raffaeli (1998)
Denis Podalydès (2000)
Coraly Zahonero (2000)
Florence Viala (2000)

21st century

Alexandre Pavloff (2002)
Françoise Gillard (2002)
Céline Samie (2004)
Clotilde de Bayser (2004)
Jérôme Pouly (2004)
Laurent Stocker (2004)
Pierre Vial (2005)
Guillaume Gallienne (2005)
Laurent Natrella (2007)
Michel Vuillermoz (2007)
Elsa Lepoivre (2007)
Christian Gonon (2009)
Julie Sicard (2009)
Loïc Corbery (2010)
Léonie Simaga (2010)
Serge Bagdassarian (2011)
Hervé Pierre (2011)
Bakary Sangaré (2013)
Pierre Louis-Calixte (2013)
Christian Hecq (2013)
Nicolas Lormeau (2014)
Gilles David (2014)
Stéphane Varupenne (2015)
Suliane Brahim (2016)
Adeline d'Hermy (2016)
Georgia Scalliet (2017)
Jérémy Lopez (2017)
Clément Hervieu-Léger (2018)
Benjamin Lavernhe (2019)
Sébastien Pouderoux (2019)
Didier Sandre (2020)
Christophe Montenez (2020)

See also
 Administrators of the Comédie-Française

External links
 List of all the sociétaires on the Comédie-Française site
 Comédie-française (1658-1900): Liste alphabétique des sociétaires at Google Books

 
Lists of actors